Aristotelia isopelta is a moth of the family Gelechiidae. It was described by Edward Meyrick in 1929. It is found in North America, where it has been recorded from Arizona, British Columbia, California, Indiana, Maine, Massachusetts, Quebec and Texas.

The wingspan is 9–12 mm. The forewings are fuscous slightly speckled whitish, or sometimes light ochreous suffusedly mixed white and speckled fuscous, with some scattered dark fuscous scales. There is a triangular black costal blotch before the middle, reaching to the fold. The second discal stigma is very small and black. The hindwings are grey.

References

Moths described in 1929
Aristotelia (moth)
Moths of North America